Yared Zeleke is an Ethiopian film director from Addis Ababa. He has an M.F.A. in Writing and Directing from New York University. His first feature film, Lamb, was screened at the 2015 Cannes Film Festival, Un Certain Regard. It is the first film from Ethiopia to have been officially selected in the festival's 68-year history.

References

External links

Ethiopian emigrants to the United States
Living people
Ethiopian film directors
Year of birth missing (living people)